Uranolophus is a genus of prehistoric lungfish which lived during the Late Devonian period. It is the type genus of the family Uranolophidae.

Sources

 Early Vertebrates by Philippe Janvier

Prehistoric lungfish genera
Late Devonian animals
Late Devonian fish
Devonian bony fish
Devonian animals of North America